2001 Malta Open was a darts tournament, which took place in Malta in 2001.

Results

References

2001 in darts
2001 in Maltese sport
Darts in Malta